Besapara Hill (Halm Besapara \'h&lm be-sa-'pa-ra\) is a hill of 250m projecting from Sopot Ice Piedmont in Delchev Ridge, Tangra Mountains on Livingston Island, South Shetland Islands in Antarctica.  The hill was mapped in the Bulgarian topographic survey Tangra 2004/05, and is named after the ancient Thracian town of Besapara, ancestor of the present Bulgarian city of Pazardzhik.

Location

Maps
 L.L. Ivanov et al. Antarctica: Livingston Island and Greenwich Island, South Shetland Islands. Scale 1:100000 topographic map. Sofia: Antarctic Place-names Commission of Bulgaria, 2005.
 L.L. Ivanov. Antarctica: Livingston Island and Greenwich, Robert, Snow and Smith Islands. Scale 1:120000 topographic map.  Troyan: Manfred Wörner Foundation, 2009.

References
 Besapara Hill. SCAR Composite Gazetteer of Antarctica
 Bulgarian Antarctic Gazetteer. Antarctic Place-names Commission. (details in Bulgarian, basic data in English)

External links
 Besapara Hill. Copernix satellite image

Hills of Antarctica
Hills of Livingston Island